The Unexpurgated Code: A Complete Manual of Survival & Manners is a 1975 non-fiction humorous book by J. P. Donleavy.

Overview 
The book is a guide for people who feel that they should belong to the manner born - that is, not having to work and generally living a life of luxury. 

Chapters:
Social Climbing
Extinctions and Mortalities
Vilenesses Various
In Pursuit of Comfortable Habits
Perils and Precautions

Advice 
The book consists of hundreds of anecdotes and events one may encounter throughout life, and how to deal with them. Some examples include:

Upon Embellishing your Background
Accent Improvement
Upon the Sudden Reawakening of your Sordid Background
Ass kissing and other types of Flattery
Suicide
Cannibalism
Upon Saucy Assemblages
Upon Marrying a Lady for Her Money
Stripping and Streaking
When the Overwhelming Desire to Goose a Lady Cannot be Suppressed
Upon Being a Member of the Titled Classes
Blowing upon Your Soup
Wife Beating
Shabby People
Shabby Shabby People
Shabby Shabby Shabby People

Quotations
Shaving: "Hey why are you growing that beard."..."I say, you unpleasantly unfortunate radoteur, I'm not doing a thing. You're shaving every day."

When Some Supercilious Cunt Asks Is There Anything Wrong: "Yes, you evil little man, I'm looking at your tie."

How to Prevent People from Detesting You: "Don't try."

The Psychologist: "This smug son of a bitch."

References

Notes

External links
jpdonleavycompendium.org



1975 books
Satirical books